Comet is an unincorporated community in southeast Dade County, in the U.S. state of Missouri. The community lies on the banks of the Sac River, approximately six miles north-northwest of Ash Grove.

History
A post office called Comet was established in 1896, and remained in operation until 1907. The name Comet most likely is a transfer from the Eastern United States.

References

Unincorporated communities in Dade County, Missouri
Unincorporated communities in Missouri